SM UC-7 was a German Type UC I minelayer submarine or U-boat in the German Imperial Navy during World War I. The U-boat had been ordered by November 1914 and was launched on 6 July 1915. She was commissioned into the German Imperial Navy on 9 July 1915 as SM UC-7. Mines laid by UC-7 in her 34 patrols were credited with sinking 32 ships.

Design
A German Type UC I submarine, UC-7 had a displacement of  when at the surface and  while submerged. The submarine was powered by one Daimler-Motoren-Gesellschaft six-cylinder, four-stroke diesel engine producing , an electric motor producing , and one propeller shaft.

UC-7 was fitted with six  mine tubes, twelve UC 120 mines, and one  machine gun. She was built by AG Vulcan Stettin and her complement was fourteen crew members.

Fate
UC-7 sailed from Zeebrugge on 3 July 1916 to lay mines off the English coast and failed to return.  sighted a submarine believed to be UC-7 on 5 July, west of the Bligh Bank,  from Ostend. The submarine in question was reported to be on a course that would run it into a minefield, and Verschollen notes that the time and place would be correct if UC-7 were returning to base. The bodies of two crew members were later washed ashore on the coast of Flanders on 19 July. She was claimed that UC-7 was sunk by HMS Salmon on 7 July off Southwold, but this was doubted since the reported position was too far off UC-7's operating area.

Summary of raiding history

References

Notes

Citations

Bibliography

 
 

German Type UC I submarines
U-boats commissioned in 1915
World War I submarines of Germany
Maritime incidents in 1917
U-boats sunk in 1917
1915 ships
World War I minelayers of Germany
Ships built in Hamburg
Missing U-boats of World War I